Brainstorming software is computer software that is used for the development of creative ideas—brainstorming.  Some formats or structures for this include flow charts, idea maps, word association and generative idea creation programs.  Ideation is often associated with brainstorming software.  Some of the earliest brainstorming software programs included Paramind and programs using Markov chains called Markov text generators.

See also
 Mind mapping software
 Outliner
 Personal wiki

References

Collaborative software